Olga Mykytenko is a German (Ukrainian origin) soprano opera singer.

Biography 
Born in Zhytomyr, Olga Mykytenko made her debut as a soloist in 1995 at the National Opera of Ukraine in Kyiv and was there through 2003. She won several international awards, including the Grand Prix at Maria Callas International Singing contest in Athens (1997), 2nd prize and Special Award at Francisco Vinas contest in Barcelona (1997) and 1st prize at the Queen Sonja International Music Competition in Oslo (2003).

Since 2001 Olga Mykytenko performed at such world opera houses, like Mariinsky Theatre, Berlin State Opera, Royal Swedish Opera, Deutsche Oper Berlin, Metropolitan Opera, Liceu (Barcelona), Semperoper in Dresden, Bayerische Staatsoper, etc.

In 2017 Olga has published her first philosophical novel "Solo OM" based on her own biography. English and German version of the book have been published in 2020 and are available online.

In 2020 was issued the new CD "I Vespri Verdiani"-Verdi Arias with Bournemouth Symphony Orchestra under Kirill Karabits.

In October 2021 singer's new album "Lichter Sonnenschein" - Lieder von Richard Strauss has been released.

References

External links
 

21st-century Ukrainian women opera singers
1974 births
Living people
Musicians from Zhytomyr